Çatalkaya is a village in the Yayladere District, Bingöl Province, Turkey. The village is populated by Kurds of the Kubat tribe and had a population of 26 in 2021.

Tha hamlet of Karagöz is attached to the village.

References 

Villages in Yayladere District
Kurdish settlements in Bingöl Province